William H. Smith may refer to:

William H. Smith (boxer) (1904–1955), South African boxer of the 1920s
William H. Smith (Medal of Honor) (1847–1877), Medal of Honor recipient
William H. Smith (Connecticut politician) (1842–1915), warden of the Borough of Norwalk, Connecticut
William Hugh Smith (1826–1899), Governor of Alabama
William Henry Smith (1792–1865), founder of the WHSmith chain of newsagents
William Henry Smith (1825–1891), son of the founder of WHSmith, businessman and politician
William Henry Smith (American politician) (1833–1896), newspaper editor and Republican politician in Ohio
William Henry Smith (Canadian politician) (1826–1890), lawyer and political figure in Nova Scotia, Canada

See also 

William Smith (disambiguation)